St. Gallen–Altenrhein Airport  is a small airport in Altenrhein in the Canton of St. Gallen, Switzerland, near Lake Constance. It is the home base for People's airline.

History
At the end of World War II, Swiss authorities identified existing locations that were to be modernized as regional airports, a second tier of infrastructure to support the primary urban airports, with St. Gallen-Altenrhein being one of the five.

Austrian Airlines served St. Gallen-Altenrhein from Vienna since 2003 when it took over the route from Rheintalflug, a predecessor of InterSky. The airport decided to terminate the contracts with Austrian in 2011 and started their own airline, People's (formerly People's Viennaline), to serve the route. Austrian decided to continue the route as well in direct competition. As a result, there were up to six daily flights from the small airport to Vienna during that period. In spring 2013, Austrian announced the termination of its route to Vienna due to continuing losses as a result of the harsh competition. After that, People's offered a codeshare agreement to Austrian, which it declined.

Facilities

Terminal
The airport features a small passenger terminal building and some apron and hangar stands for aircraft such as the Embraer 170, business jets or general aviation planes such as the Cessna 172. As there are no jet bridges, walk-boarding is used.

Runway
The paved, eastbound runway 10 is equipped with an Instrument landing system (ILS CAT I). Due to its short length the main runway can only be used by smaller passenger aircraft such as the Embraer E-Jets or the Bombardier Q Series.

Airlines and destinations
The following airline offers regularly scheduled and seasonal flights at St. Gallen–Altenrhein Airport:

The nearest larger airport is Friedrichshafen Airport in Germany, on the opposite side of Lake Constance,  to the north-west by car or by ferry.

Statistics

Ground transportation
The airport can be reached via motorway A1 (Zürich - Winterthur, Exit Rheineck-Thal). Taxis and a shuttle service are available. There is also a scheduled bus connection from the airport to the nearby towns of Rorschach and Rheineck and their railway stations.

Incidents and accidents 
 On 24 January 1994, a Cessna 425 crashed into Lake Constance at Rorschach during its approach to the airport, killing all 5 people on board.

See also
 Transport in Switzerland
 RUAG

References

Notes

External links

 St. Gallen-Altenrhein Airport (German)
 
 

Airports in Switzerland
Buildings and structures in the canton of St. Gallen